Shaheed Ahsan Ullah Master General Hospital is a government hospital situated in Gazipur, Bangladesh.

Location
The hospital is located on Station Road near Dhaka-Mymensingh Highway in Tongi town of Gazipur district.

History
There was a hospital called Tongi General Hospital in the past. A new hospital building was constructed on the land of that hospital later. In 2017, the government announced the name of the new hospital, named after Ahsanullah Master, in a notification about two months after the inauguration of the hospital. However, one year after the inauguration of the new building, the new building could not be used to serve the patients due to modern equipment, inadequate doctors and other problems. There are also many more complaints about the hospital. In 2020, the hospital was one of the COVID-19 test centers. On April 25, 2021, a hospital surgeon died of the corona virus. It was one of the dengue dedicated hospitals in 2021. In 2022, three people were arrested for obstructing the submission of hospital tenders.

References

Tongi
Hospitals in Bangladesh
Hospital buildings completed in 2017
2017 establishments in Bangladesh